Robert Tobler (23 December 1901 – 17 June 1962) was a Swiss far-right politician.

Born in Zürich, he followed his father by studying law at University of Zurich and working as a lawyer. Initially attracted to liberalism, he came into contact with Hans Oehler and soon helped to found the New Front in 1930. As chairman of the new group he was heavily influenced by Othmar Spann, although fascism quickly became more important for the Front.

He served as Gaufuehrer for Zürich in the National Front and ran the party paper Die Front, which was funded by Nazi Germany. Tobler was elected to the Swiss parliament in 1935, becoming the only member of the National Front (or indeed any pro-Nazi group) to hold a parliamentary seat in the country. He took over as Front leader in 1938, leading to his predecessor Rolf Henne splitting the movement. Tobler attempted to find a common ground with the government, although by this time it was too late as the movement already had a reputation as firmly pro-Nazi. He was imprisoned in 1940 as a fifth columnist and the Front fell into decay. After his release he led the Eidgenössische Sammlung and Schaffhausen Nationale Gemeinschaft, although both these groups were outlawed in 1943 as part of a wider ban on the National Front and its offshoots. Tobler took no further role in politics and died in his home town.

References

1901 births
1962 deaths
Politicians from Zürich
Swiss Calvinist and Reformed Christians
Swiss Nazis
National Front (Switzerland) politicians
Members of the National Council (Switzerland)
20th-century Swiss lawyers
People associated with the University of Zurich